Ingenio is a town and a Spanish municipality in the eastern part of the island of Gran Canaria in the Province of Las Palmas in the Canary Islands.

The municipality includes the town Carrizal. The GC-1 motorway passes east of the town, and the Gran Canaria Airport is situated in the eastern part of the municipality. In agriculture, sugar cane is one of the dominant crops in Ingenio.

The municipality is home to the International Folklore Festival which has the participation of music groups worldwide including Mexico, Colombia, Romania, Russia and Uganda.

Historical population

See also
List of municipalities in Las Palmas

References

External links
 Villa de Ingenio

Municipalities in Gran Canaria